Telstra Group Limited is an Australian telecommunications company that builds and operates telecommunications networks and markets voice, mobile, internet access, pay television and other products and services. It is a member of the S&P/ASX 20 and Australia's largest telecommunications company by market share. Telstra is the largest wireless carrier in Australia, with 18.8 million subscribers as of 2020.

Telstra has a long history in Australia, originating together with Australia Post as the Postmaster-General's Department upon federation in 1901. Telstra has transitioned from a state-owned enterprise to a fully privatised company and has recently focused on diversified products and emerging technologies.

History

Australia's telecommunications services were originally controlled by the Postmaster-General's Department (PMG), formed in 1901 as a result of Australian Federation. Prior to 1901, telecommunications were administered by each colony. On 1 July 1975, separate commissions were established by statute to replace the PMG. Responsibility for postal services was transferred to the Australian Postal Commission (Australia Post). The Australian Telecommunications Commission (ATC), trading as Telecom Australia, ran domestic telecommunication services.

In 1989, the ATC introduced new buildings and frameworks.

In 1993, the Overseas Telecommunications Commission, a separate government body established in 1946, was merged with the Australian Telecommunications Corporation into the short-lived Australian and Overseas Telecommunications Corporation (AOTC) which continued trading under the established identities of Telecom and OTC. The AOTC was renamed to Telstra Corporation Limited in 1993. The name "Telstra" is derived from the word Telecom Australia (TEL from Telecom and STRA from Australia). The corporation then traded under the "Telstra" brand internationally and "Telecom Australia" domestically until uniform branding of "Telstra" was introduced throughout the entire organisation in 1995, following an unsuccessful attempt to register the trademark "Telecom Australia".

Telstra has faced competition since the early 1990s from Optus (Australia's second largest communication company) and a number of smaller providers. Telstra once retained ownership of the fixed-line telephone network, but since the nationwide upgrade to the National Broadband Network (NBN), the Australian Government now has legal ownership of these lines since 2007, though Telstra has played a big part in this upgrade supplying resources to the Government on the new network. Telstra also has pay TV and owns 35% of the Australian media company Foxtel. Other companies offering fixed-line services must therefore deal with Telstra, except Optus, TransACT and a few others who have installed their own infrastructure.

Overseas Telecommunications Commission

The Overseas Telecommunications Commission (OTC) was established by an Act of Parliament in August 1946. It inherited facilities and resources from Amalgamated Wireless Australasia Limited (AWA) and Cable & Wireless, and was charged with responsibility for all international telecommunications services into, through and out of Australia.

On 1 February 1992, it was merged with Australia's domestic telecommunications carrier, the Australian Telecommunications Corporation Limited ("Telecom"), to create the Australian and Overseas Telecommunications Corporation Limited (AOTC). The new organisation underwent a corporate identity review and was subsequently renamed Telstra Corporation Limited ("Telstra") for international business in 1993 and domestic business in 1995.

Privatisation
Beginning in 1997 and finalizing in 2011, the federal government began to privatise the corporation. The first three stages were initiated by the Liberal–National Coalition's Howard Government: the first, informally known as "T1" (with shares priced at $3.30), occurred in 1997. "T2" ($7.40) followed in 1999; "T3" ($3.60) in 2006.
In T1, the government sold one third of its shares in Telstra for A$14 billion and publicly listed the company on the Australian Stock Exchange. In 1998, a further 16% of Telstra shares were sold to the public, leaving the Australian government with 51% ownership. In 2006, T3 was announced by the government and was the largest of the three public releases, reducing the government's ownership of Telstra to 17%. The 17% remainder of Telstra was placed in Australia's Future Fund, a sovereign wealth fund established mainly to meet future liabilities for payment of superannuation to retired federal public servants. In 2009, the Future Fund sold off another $2.4 billion worth of shares, reducing the government's stake in Telstra to 10.9%. In August 2011, under Labor's Gillard Government, the Future Fund sold its remaining "above market weight" Telstra shares, reducing its holding to 0.8% of the shares, effectively completing Telstra's privatisation.

With more than one million shareholders, Telstra is currently the most widely held ASX-listed company.

National Broadband Network

On 26 November 2008, Telstra submitted a non-complying tender issued by the federal government to build a National Broadband Network, a 12-page letter proposing a $5 billion broadband network covering between 80 and 90 percent of the Australian population in major cities, despite the tender requiring 98 percent coverage.

As a result, Telstra was removed from the National Broadband Network RFP process on 15 December 2008. In response, Telstra announced that it would raise speeds on its existing Next G network and HFC "cable" network so that they both offer higher speeds than the RFP for the NBN requires. Following Telstra's exclusion from the National Broadband Network bidding process Telstra's share price suffered the biggest one-day percentage fall in its history.

Telstra agreed to "disconnect" its Internet customers from the copper and hybrid fibre-coaxial networks in areas where FTTP has been installed, and agreed to lease dark fibre, exchange space and ducts to NBN Co. As part of the agreement, Telstra would not be able to market their mobile network as an alternative to the NBN for a number of years. Telstra remains the owner of its networks. On 18 October 2011, Telstra shareholders overwhelmingly approved the deal.

On 14 December 2014 it was announced that in a A$11b renegotiated deal Telstra will transfer ownership of its copper and hybrid fibre-coaxial (HFC) networks to NBN while disconnecting premises from these networks. This ownership allows NBN Co to use these networks "where it sees fit in for its multi-technology NBN rollout."

David Thodey era (2010–2015)
Under the leadership of David Thodey, Telstra embarked upon a transformation agenda to become more sales and service focused.
As part of that, an ambitious customer service agenda was defined.

In 2014, Telstra was named "most respected company" by the Australian Financial Review newspaper.

Market share recovery
Early in 2010, Telstra announced the creation of a $1 billion "fighting fund" to be used in a concerted effort to win back market share in key product categories. This effort seems to have paid off with strong sales momentum announced in February 2011.

Customer service recovery
As part of its new strategy, Telstra announced that its "goal is for customer service to be fundamental to everything we do". In August 2011, Telstra Digital announced expansion of customer service into social media with 24/7 coverage. By November 2012, Telstra claimed 140,000 live chats for the month and a growth rate of this service of 600% p.a. In October 2013, Telstra announced that it had grown its Live Chat workforce to 600 and its social media workforce to 30.

The following table shows total complaints handled by the Telecommunications Industry Ombudsman (TIO) 2010–2015, and of those, the ones made against Telstra.

Telstra Digital
In February 2011, Telstra announced the formation of Telstra Digital under the leadership of Gerd Schenkel who was hired from National Australia Bank/UBank. Telstra Digital's initial purpose was to improve the use of digital channels for customer service. In April 2011, Telstra Digital relaunched its web homepage design. In July 2011, Telstra Digital launched "CrowdSupport", an online forum to crowd source customer service. As of July 2017, Telstra's "CrowdSupport" had 463,000 posts. It was also cited as an example of "scaling at the edge" by Deloitte's Centre for the Edge.

In September 2011, Telstra Digital launched a new account services portal to help achieve its goal of managing 35% of Telstra's transactions. In October 2011, Telstra Digital announced a new mobile smartphone optimised version of its website. In November 2011, Telstra Digital launched an iPhone app on a trial basis as well as a new online mobile phone shop.
In July 2012, Telstra Digital launched smartphone and Facebook apps for customers to manage their Telstra accounts and in November 2012, Telstra claimed that over 700,000 customers had downloaded those apps. In August 2013, Telstra revealed that the apps reached 2.5 million downloads.

At a results announcement, CEO David Thodey remarked that "the group's new online strategy was delivering" in the context of a 28% reduction of inbound service calls. Telstra estimated that its digital program will provide productivity benefits of $100 million in the 2013 financial year from lower printing costs, decreasing commissions to third parties, and reduced dependence on call center staff.

In October 2012, Telstra's CEO David Thodey stated, "The rise of online and social media had 'fundamentally changed the way' which the company communicated with its customers". In a 2015 Deloitte report, Telstra disclosed that its "CrowdSupport" service community had generated 200,000 pieces of user-generated content. In August 2016, Telstra disclosed that "more than 60%" of visitors to "CrowdSupport" manage to find an answer on the community.

In February 2013, Telstra introduced the ability to pay its bills via PayPal. And in June 2013, Telstra launched a new website, including the ability for customers to link their online accounts to their Facebook identity.

In March 2014, Telstra announced a new digital development program called "Digital First" with a stated aim to conduct 65 to 70 percent of its transactions online. Telstra published a white paper sharing some key metrics of its digital program:

In September 2014, Telstra announced the opening of a "Digital Transformation Centre" in Sydney to design and built new digital tools for its service systems.

In June 2014, Telstra disclosed that it had 3 million customers on "electronic billing" saving it $3 million per month in costs. Telstra also mentioned that live chat accounted for 10% of total contact centre activity.

In December 2015, Telstra Digital launched customer service on Periscope.

In October 2016, the Executive Director of Telstra Digital Gerd Schenkel left Telstra to become CEO of a fintech company.

Retail store network

Telstra owns and operates a series of retail stores known as Telstra Stores. Some are directly owned and operated by Telstra and some are operated by licensees.

As of May 2016, Telstra has a total of 360 retail stores across Australia. This includes several new 'Discovery' stores, where Telstra has invested millions in redesigning key stores based on local requirements. These designs include new displays, accessory shops, digital tickets and free baristas.

109 of Telstra's stores are owned and operated by Vita Group, a publicly listed company with a market capitalisation of approximately $600m (June 2016).

In February 2011, Telstra announced the creation of an additional 100 retail stores within three years.

In August 2016, Telstra disclosed that "over 300" Telstra stores were equipped with low energy Bluetooth beacons.

The carrier opened the world's first Android store, called "Androidland", on Bourke Street, Melbourne, Australia, in December 2011.

These developments built on Telstra's T[life] concept stores it had launched in the early 2000s.

New brand

In October 2011, Telstra launched a new brand identity and color scheme. The new identity launched with the slogan "It's how we connect", and features the "T" from the previous logo in a variety of colors. This was followed by a "brand refresh" in February 2014 and again in 2016.
In 2013, Telstra was assessed as Australia's third most valuable brand, after Woolworths and BHP Billiton. In 2016 Telstra became Australia's most valuable brand, which it maintained in 2017.

Sponsorships
Telstra sponsors numerous awards around Australia, including the Australian Business of the Year award, the MYOB Small Business Award, and the National Aboriginal & Torres Strait Islander Art Award (NATSIAA) which has become known as the Telstra Award. Notable past winners include Vaxine, APS Plastics, and eWAY.

Telstra was a major sponsor of the V8 Supercars car racing championship through its BigPond brand and directly sponsored the Sydney Telstra 500 event, the final round of the series held at Sydney Olympic Park. The sport ended this deal at the conclusion of the 2012 season.

Telstra had naming rights to the Docklands Stadium in Melbourne from 2002 until 2009. Telstra is also the naming rights sponsor of the National Rugby League Premiership. Telstra is also the principal sponsor of Swimming Australia. They also sponsored the Minardi team for the 2002 Formula One season, and the Rally Australia 2006 Championships.

Telstra also had the naming rights (under TelstraClear) for the TelstraClear Pacific events centre in Manukau City, New Zealand.

Share price development
In November 1997, the Australian government sold the first tranche of its Telstra shares, 4.29 Billion shares, publicly at a price of $3.40 per share to institutional investors and $3.30 to retail investors. This sale is commonly referred to as "T1". In October 1999, the Australian government sold the second tranche of its Telstra shares under the "T2" program for $7.80 per share to institutional investors and $7.40 to retail investors. In November 2006, the government sold a third tranche of its shares, "T3", at $3.60 per share.

Since its privatisation, Telstra shares have hit a low of just over $2.50 per share in late 2010. Since then, Telstra shares have risen to $5 per share in December 2013 and $6 per share in December 2014.
On 17 May 2019 the shares closed on the ASX at $3.56 up from a twelve-month low of $2.547 per share

In February 2014, Telstra raised its dividend from 14c to 14.5c per share.

Amid the global pandemic crisis of the coronavirus in 2020, Telstra was one of three companies of the ASX 200 to gain in the week starting 15 March. It increased by 1.8 percent on the Australian Securities Exchange.

Sale of Sensis
In January 2014, Telstra announced its intention to sell 70% of Sensis to Platinum Equity for $454 million. Sensis was said to have once been "one of Telstra's most lucrative businesses" and reportedly "has been under pressure in recent years amid competition from more agile digital alternatives such as Google".

In February 2014, Telstra was reportedly seeking to reduce Sensis employment by 400 to 1,000 positions.

New health business unit
In September 2013, Telstra launched a new health business unit – Telstra Health and hired Shane Solomon as the head.

In September 2016, Telstra Health was awarded a $220m government contract amidst claims of "lack of transparency".

Shane Solomon left Telstra in Nov 2016.

Telstra Health Acquisitions

National Broadband Network (NBN)
In December 2014, Telstra signed an agreement with the federal government's A.C.N. 86 136 533 741 (NBN Co) Limited. This agreement is said to retain the $11b value for Telstra of the original agreement from October 2011 and will see the company progressively sell its copper and Hybrid_fiber-coaxial networks to A.C.N. 86 136 533 741 (NBN Co) Limited.

Andrew Penn era (2015–2022) 
On 19 February 2015, Telstra announced that CEO David Thodey would retire on 1 May 2015 and be replaced by successor Andy Penn. Penn indicated new focus on growth in international markets, however this strategy experienced a setback with the failure of a joint venture to build a mobile phone network in the Philippines. On 14 March 2016, Telstra ended their talks between the company and the Philippine-based conglomerate San Miguel Corporation for a planned joint telecommunications venture in the Philippines due to several factors.

In 2016, Telstra suffered a series of network outages for which the company apologised. In December of that year, Telstra announced the appointment of Robyn Denholm as its new COO, following the departure of Kate McKenzie who left after a series of network outages. In December, Telstra announced the hire of a new CTO to replace the predecessor who left amongst allegations of CV fraud. In 2016, the government raised the possibility that Telstra's regional mobile network may be forced to be opened to competitor' use under a roaming scheme. A prospect strongly being fought by Telstra.

In February 2017, Telstra announced a that revenue had dropped 3.5%, Net Profit After Tax had dropped by over 14%. As a result, Telstra's share price dropped by 4.5% on the same day. In August 2017, Telstra announced that it would cut its dividend, leading to a drop in share price by over 10% in a single day to reach a 5-year low. Andy Penn's CEO tenure had been severely tarnished after $28.5b in Telstra's market value had been destroyed under his leadership.

T22 Strategy 
In May 2018, Telstra issued a profit warning which lead to a decline in the company's share price of 4% on that day. In the weeks after the announcement, the share price continued to drop to a seven-year low, amidst speculation that the company may be forced to cut its dividend again. As a consequence, [CEO] [Andy Penn]'s tenure came into question with his presiding over a $46b loss of shareholder value.

In June 2018, Telstra announced its Telstra2022 Strategy designed to face into headwinds from the NBN rollout and return the business to growth. Composed of four pillars, the strategy was designed to remove $1 billion of operating costs from the business, simplifying its overall structure and leading to six key outcomes: improve customer experiences, simplify its products and operating model, extend network superiority and 5G leadership, achieve global high performance in employee engagement, reduce net productivity costs, and attain a return on capital investment post the NBN rollout.

On 20 June 2018, Telstra announced a reduction of 9,500 jobs (8,000 net job losses after considering 1,500 new roles to be created) as part of its "Telstra 2022" (T22) plan. The news was not well received: Telstra's share price dropped as much as 7.4% immediately. Unions, politicians, and the wider community condemned the move which was widely considered a last ditch attempt of Andy Penn to secure his own job.

InfraCo 
Created on 1 July 2018, Telstra InfraCo would serve as the infrastructure business, owning an estimated $11 billion AUD in assets made up of data centres, non-mobiles related domestic fibre, copper, HFC, subsea cables, exchanges, poles, ducts, and pipes. InfraCo opened its dark fibre network across six Australian state capitals in February 2021. Telstra said the dark fibre network would open up a wealth of capabilities and control for its targeted audience of network operates and service providers such as global carriers, data centre operators, internet service producers and over the top providers.

Retail Store Strategy 
In February 2021, Telstra announced plans to take back full ownership of its 337 retail stores. At the time of the announcement Telstra owned and operated 67 of its stores, Vita Group owned and operated 104 stores, and the remaining 166 were operated by individual licensees. The process of transitioning stores back to Telstra ownership will take around 12 to 18 months to complete.

Vicki Brady era (2022–present) 
On 30 March 2022, Telstra announced that Vicki Brady will become the new chief executive officer effective 1 September 2022.

Products and services

Fixed-line and mobile telephony

Telstra is Australia's incumbent and largest provider of fixed-line services. These include home phone, business and other PSTN products.

Telstra outsources a significant portion of network installation and maintenance to private contractors and joint ventures, such as ABB Communications and STCJV (Siemens Thiess Communications Joint Venture).

Telstra also owns and maintains the majority of Australia's public telephones. In 2006, Telstra announced it would remove many of the phones, citing vandalism and the increasing adoption of mobile telephones.

Telstra Mobile is Australia's largest mobile telephone service providers, in terms of both subscriptions and coverage. Telstra operates Australia's largest GSM and 3G UMTS (branded as Next G) mobile telephony networks in Australia, as well as holding a 50% stake in the 3GIS Ltd 2100 MHz UMTS network infrastructure, shared with Hutchison (Three). As of September 2007, Telstra had an estimated 9.3M mobile subscribers. Telstra Mobile services are available in post-paid and prepaid payment types, known as Telstra Pre-Paid (formerly communic8 Pre-Paid).

Telstra's GSM network was the first digital mobile network in Australia. It was launched in April 1993 on the 900 MHz band as "Telstra MobileNet Digital". The GSM network has carried the majority of Telstra's mobile subscribers for the last 10 years and has seen numerous upgrades. 1800 MHz capacity channels were added to the network in the late 1990s as well as GPRS packet data transmission capabilities. As part of the UMTS Next G deployment, the GSM network was also upgraded to a full EDGE data transmission capability in 2006 providing data transmission capabilities greater than 40 kbit/s on its GSM network.

In 1981, Telstra (then Telecom Australia) was the first company to provide mobile telephony services in Australia. The first automated mobile service operated in the major capital cities on 500 MHz using the '007' dialling prefix. This network only provided "car phone" capabilities to subscribers as portable hand-held terminals were not practical at that time. The first cellular system in Australia offering portable hand-held phones was launched by Telstra in 1987 using the AMPS analogue standard on the 800 MHz band. This network at its peak had over 1 million subscribers, but was mandated by the government to be closed down by 2000, partially due to privacy concerns which resulted from the AMPS technology, but also because of arrangements undertaken to secure sufficient interest in the GSM network licenses offered in 1992 to competitors. A license condition placed on Telstra to maintain an equivalent coverage footprint at the time resulted in Telstra deciding to deploy an IS-95 CDMA network in its place.

Telstra operates over 7,400 Next G Base Stations.

Internet

Wholesale

Telstra Wholesale provides products such as Data, Mobile, Voice, and other Facilities (including Co-location and Duct Access) to other companies and organisations for re-sale. Telstra Wholesale also provides operational support for its customers, and facilities for international customers such as International Data Transport and IP Transport.

Due to Telstra's position as Australia's incumbent telecommunications provider, Telstra Wholesale is the incumbent and dominant wholesaler of ADSL services to other Internet Service Providers. Telstra installed the first DSLAMs in exchanges prior to 2000, and began wholesaling access in late 2000. Telstra Wholesale has a comprehensive network of ADSL DSLAMs (the largest in Australia) and allows competitors access to each Telstra DSLAM at up to ADSL2+ speeds if available, and at ADSL1 speeds should 2+ be unavailable.

Since 2013, Telstra has wholesaled its 3G and 4G network. However the wholesale product only gives access to 7000 of Telstra's over 8000 base stations, and does not include access to its faster 4GX and 5G networks.

Retail internet
Telstra provides internet services for personal and business clients, through its internet service provider (ISP), BigPond. BigPond provides internet products over various delivery methods, including ADSL, Cable Internet, Dialup, Satellite, and Wireless Internet (through the Next G network). At the end of the 2007 financial year, BigPond had over two million broadband subscribers. In 2007 a survey of 14,000 people by PC Authority magazine found BigPond users rated poorly for customer service, and less than a third considered their service value for money. However, BigPond argued that the survey's structure had encouraged people to provide extreme opinions. In January 2009, Telstra was ranked as the top Australian ISP in terms of performance by Epitiro.

Since 2013, the BigPond brand has been discontinued and merged with Telstra.

Cable internet
Cable – BigPond is Australia's largest provider of Cable Internet access, which covers parts of Australia's main cities (Melbourne, Brisbane, Perth, Sydney, Adelaide and the Gold Coast). Speeds available are 'Turbo' (8 Mbit/s downstream, 128 kbit/s upstream), 'Elite' (30 Mbit/s down, 1 Mbit/s up) and 'Ultimate' (100 Mbit/s down, 2 Mbit/s up).
Telstra owned and operated the largest cable internet Hybrid Fibre cable network in Australia. Telstra Cable operates in selected cities and areas of Australia including (Melbourne, Brisbane, Canberra, Sydney, Perth, Adelaide and the Gold Coast), providing downstream speeds of up to 30 Mbit/s in selected areas. The upgrade to 100 Mbit/s was complete in Melbourne by Christmas 2009, and launched the new DOCSIS 3.0 services on 1 December 2009 before the deadline.

This network has since been acquired by the National Broadband Network Company (NBNCo) for public cable broadband but is still used to distribute Cable TV under the Foxtel brand.

ADSL internet
ADSL – BigPond provides both ADSL and ADSL2+ services where available, with speeds ranging from 256 kbit/s down/64 kbit/s up to 20 Mbit/s down/1 Mbit/s up. The current speeds available on ADSL plans that BigPond offers are "up to" 1.5 Mbit/s down/256 kbit/s up, "up to" 8 Mbit/s down/384 kbit/s up and "up to" 20 Mbit/s down/1 Mbit/s up.
Naked DSL – A six-week trial of two kinds of naked DSL to "assess customer demand" was launched on 1 June 2010. 'Pure DSL' having the ability to receive incoming calls and make emergency calls, and 'Naked DSL' being offered without a dial tone.

On 10 November 2006, Telstra made two major changes to their ADSL network. The first was an increase of wholesale ADSL speeds from 1.5 Mbit/s/256 kbit/s to 8 Mbit/s/384 kbit/s. Telstra also released an ADSL2+ broadband service offering download speeds of up to 24 Mbit/s from exchanges where competitors were already offering ADSL2+ services.

On 6 February 2008, Telstra announced that it would activate high-speed ADSL2+ broadband in a further 900 telephone exchanges serving 2.4 million consumers across every state and territory in Australia. Telstra also claimed that it has received assurances from the Government that it would not be forced to wholesale these services to other providers, and that the move came "after the Government made clear it did not consider a compelling case had been made for regulating third-party access to the service – an assurance sought by Telstra for more than one year".

On 10 June 2008, it was announced that Telstra was in discussions with some wholesale customers in reference to wholesaling ADSL2+ services.

Mobile broadband
 Mobile Broadband – Through Telstra's Next G network, BigPond provides the largest wireless network coverage in Australia, reaching 99% of the population. Download speeds on the 3G network range from 256 kbit/s to 3.5 Mbit/s in regional and interurban areas, and "up to" 21 Mbit/s in metropolitan and city areas. Download speeds on the 4G Network are "up to" 100Mbit/s.  The Telstra mobile network now has 4GX and 5G in all capital CBDs and selected suburban and regional areas and is progressively rolling out. In other coverage areas around Australia, Mobile devices that are capable will automatically switch to the fastest available 5G 4G or 3G. Typical download speeds in 4GX areas are 5 -300Mbit/s with category 16 devices, 5–200Mbit/s with category 11 devices, 5–150Mbit/s with category 9 devices, 2–100Mbit/s with category 6 devices, and 2–75Mbit/s with category 4 devices. BigPond also provides wireless 'hot spots'.

Satellite internet
 Satellite – Bigpond provides Satellite internet mainly for regional customers who are too far away from the exchange to get ADSL, and cannot get Cable. Satellite is delivered via 2 way Satellite with speeds ranging from 256 kbit/s down/64 kbit/s up to 800 kbit/s down/128 kbit/s up.

Dial-up internet
 Dial-up – Telstra offered dialup internet from 1995 until early 2015. However they have now ceased selling the service, and existing retail and wholesale customers have been migrated off of Dial-up.

Low-cost mobile and internet brand
In October 2013 Telstra launched "Belong", a low-cost mobile and internet service provider. As of February 2020, Belong has over 600,000 services made up of almost 340,000 mobile services and around 300,000 broadband internet services. Belong is Australia's first carbon neutral telecommunications provider certified by Climate Active, a partnership between the Australian Government and businesses that encourages voluntary action to reduce the impacts of climate change.

Subscription television
Telstra's Hybrid Fibre Coax (HFC) (commonly referred to as "cable") network is one of the delivery systems used by the Australian Subscription Television provider Foxtel. Telstra owns 35% of Foxtel in a joint venture with News Corp Australia who own the remainder. Telstra also sell Foxtel's "iQ digital-video-recorder" to customers in Foxtel's service area (as "Foxtel from Telstra"). Telstra offers discounts for Telstra full-service fixed-line customers, with internet, pay TV and/or mobile services with Telstra. Such discounts can include free installation and the first month of the best Foxtel package (all channels) for free.

Entertainment and content

BigPond Music

MOG, a subscription online music service and blog network, announced a partnership with Telstra offer their product in Australia – the first region outside of the United States to have access. Telstra and MOG launched under the BigPond Music branding on 21 June 2012, however ended this service in September 2014. They replaced it with bonus inclusions related to Apple Music.

BigPond Games and GameArena

GameArena was a website dedicated to video gaming operating under the BigPond brand that was managed by Mammoth Media and based on the east coast of Australia. The site provided news, downloads and servers primarily for the PC, and Mac, though it later branched out to include console sites. GameArena provided an online game shop GameNow, which sported various benefits to Telstra customers.

Usage of the GameArena file library, gaming servers and booking service were freely available to anyone, but provided specific advantages to Telstra customers such as preference in downloads and unmetered usage, as well as various bonuses in competitions. In 2005, GameArena went through a new shift with the merging of GameNow and Gameshop into itself. The name became simply BigPond GameArena.

GameArena once operated over 100 gaming servers, which were monitored by a volunteer force of administrators, known as GameOps. GameCreate was a service offered free of charge where users may book a server for a specific game for a 2-hour period of time. This server was private and could be used for either ladder training or social events.

GameArena servers and its website closed on 20 October 2014.

The Pond in Second Life
Telstra BigPond owned and operated a number of virtual islands in the online game Second Life for approximately three years. BigPond closed its Second Life presence in December 2009.

Facebook
In 2011, Telstra launched "Blurtl", a Facebook application that allows the user to leave audio messages on their Facebook walls.

Payphones 
In 2021, Telstra made its pay phones free
 so that they can be used in emergencies
 for when mobile phones are out of service due fire, flood, storms, flat batteries, etc.
 declining use would have meant that the cost of collection exceeded the revenue anyhow
 for the benefit of people without a mobile phone

Controversies
On 20 March 2019, Telstra denied access to millions of Australians to the websites 4chan, 8chan, Zero Hedge, and Liveleak as a reaction to the Christchurch mosque shootings.

In May 2021, the Federal Court of Australia ordered the company to pay a $50 million fine for mistreating their Indigenous customers.

Mobile networks
The following is a list of known active mobile networks used by Telstra:

February 2011: Ericsson wins the LTE contract with Telstra. The LTE network is being deployed in capital city CBDs and select regional centres throughout 2011. It will operate at 1800 MHz and integrate with a HSPA+ service at 850 MHz. A dual mode (LTE/HSPA+) mobile broadband device has been developed for the network.

January 2012: Initial major LTE rollout complete. Incremental rollout continues, widening the coverage in capital cities and introducing new LTE coverage to regional centres.

July 2012: Telstra commences retailing a pocket-sized battery powered 4G WiFi router (ZTE MF91) for prepaid data customers, locked to Telstra, complementing its range of 4G-capable devices. Apart from the ZTE MF91, the Telstra 4G hardware range now comprises two dual mode (4G/3G) voice-capable handsets by HTC and ZTE (available for purchase outright or on a post-paid plan), a Sierra USB wireless modem (outright or post-paid plan), a ZTE USB wireless modem (prepaid, locked to Telstra) and a Sierra 4G Wifi battery powered pocket-sized router (outright or post-paid plan). Telstra is reported to now be operating LTE facilities from more than 3,500 transmission sites.

August 2013: Telstra demonstrates the world's first ever LTE- Advanced Carrier Aggregation network using the 900 MHz and 1800 MHz spectrum bands in the Sunshine Coast.

April 2014: Telstra introduced a mobile broadband device from Huawei (E5786) with LTE Advanced capability.

May 2014: Telstra and Ericsson demonstrate world first 450 Mbit/s LTE-A downlink speeds in a commercial network with a Category 9 device.

September 2015: Telstra, in collaboration with NETGEAR, Ericsson and Qualcomm Technologies announce that it is bringing the world's first 4G LTE Advanced 600 Mbit/s Category 11 device to customers.

September 2016: Telstra conducts the first live 5G trial in Australia with Ericsson, demonstrating 5G capabilities in a real world environment, including speed and beam steering tests.

December 2016: Telstra shuts down the 900 MHz GSM/EDGE network on 1 December. Prior to this, EDGE data capabilities were available on 100% of the GSM networks used.

January 2017: Telstra launches world's first Gigabit LTE-Advanced mobile network.

March 2019: Telstra closed the 2100 MHz (Band 1) section of its 3G network on 25 March.

May 2020:  Telstra made available Australia's first 5G network using 3500 MHz spectrum.

April 2021:  Telstra purchased via Auction 800 MHz of 26 GHz (26,000 MHz) Spectrum nationally for 5G mmWave technology.

Next G Network

In 2005, Telstra announced a plan to upgrade its ageing networks and systems; which includes a new 3G network to replace the then current CDMA mobile network.

The network was built between November 2005 and September 2006, and launched in October 2006. , Next G was the largest mobile network in Australia, providing greater coverage than other 3G providers in Australia and over three times greater than any 2G provider in Australia. In December 2008, the Next G Network was also the fastest mobile network in the World, delivering theoretical network speeds of up to 21Mbit/s
 using features of HSPA+ and Dual-Carrier HSPA+. In February 2010, Telstra increased the speed up to 42Mbit/s making the Next G Network once again the fastest mobile network in the world.

On 26 September 2011, Telstra launched its 4G 1800 MHz LTE network, claiming typical download speeds of up to 40Mbit/s.

The network is  used for BigPond's wireless broadband service and Telstra Mobile, which is Australia's largest mobile telephone service provider, in terms of both subscriptions and coverage

Network design
It was built to replace Telstra's CDMA network which operated from 1999 until 28 April 2008. Telstra opted to use the 850 MHz band for Next G in preference to the more common 2100 MHz band, since it requires fewer base stations to provide coverage, providing a lower capital cost. This network was implemented under contract by Ericsson as part of a project internally dubbed "Project Jersey" and launched on 6 October 2006. HSPA technology was included in the network to provide Australia's first wide area wireless broadband network. The efficiency of the Next G network and its coverage has been challenged and scrutinised since its launch, requiring Telstra to go back to areas with average coverage, particularly rural towns to improve its coverage footprint. On 18 January 2008, Stephen Conroy, Minister for Communications, declined the proposal for Telstra to switch off its CDMA network on 28 January 2008, stating that whilst the Next G network provided coverage equal to or better than the CDMA network, the range of handsets available was not yet satisfactory. On 15 April 2008, the Minister gave approval to close the CDMA network after 28 April 2008. Telstra closed the network nationally during the early morning hours of 29 April 2008.

While most wireless modems offered by Telstra allow peak download speeds of up to 7.2 Mbit/s, a modem by Sierra Wireless was announced in 2009 that supported increased throughput. The "USB 306" is marketed and sold by Telstra as the "Telstra Turbo 21 Modem", and was available in limited quantity in early 2009. By April, the "Turbo 21" was available to customers and offered peak download speeds of 21 Mbit/s, although actual speeds vary between 550kbit/s and 8Mbit/s. , Next G network HSUPA upgrades in selected regional and metropolitan areas, combined with software updates for the "Turbo 21" modem, will allow peak uplink speeds of up to 5.76 Mbit/s.

4GX
On 1 January 2015, Telstra launched, what it calls "4GX": a 700 MHz based component of its mobile network claiming speeds of up to 75Mbit/s with compatible devices.

Business Technology Services (BTS) 

In January 2016, Telstra announced its acquisition of cloud service provider Kloud. This was followed closely by the acquisition of application development company Readify in July 2016.

Market position
Since the Australian telecommunications industry was deregulated in the early 1990s, Telstra has managed to remain the largest provider of telecommunications services despite the emergence of rivals Optus and TPG Telecom. A Harvard Business Review article from 2005 authored by a consultant to Telstra on this topic, reported "that a strategy of offering lower rates on some routes and at certain times of day, even though its prices, on average, were higher than its rivals", helped Telstra retain several points of market share it otherwise may have lost.

In early 2011, Telstra successfully extended its market share lead by discounting its mobile phone products.

By 2020, Telstra's revenue was $26.2 billion, Optus' was $9.0 billion, and TPG Telecom's was $4.4 billion.

Management

International holdings

Telstra has over 200 subsidiary businesses as of 30 June 2016. The full list can be found at their website

A list of major businesses that Telstra owns can be found here under:

Selected events

WotNext
In January 2007 Telstra launched WotNext, a video-publishing website that allowed users to upload videos. The video content was then sold to mobile users for A$1, which the uploader and Telstra split equally. The website was shut down in  after a media backlash over uploaded semi-pornographic videos.

Privacy investigation
On 12 July 2011, the Office of the Australian Information Commissioner (OAIC) released the findings of its investigation into a mailing list error that resulted in approximately 60,300 Telstra customers' personal information being sent to other customers. The Australian Privacy Commissioner Timothy Pilgrim said "Our investigation has confirmed that while Telstra breached the Privacy Act when the personal information of a number of its customers was disclosed to third parties; this incident was caused by a one-off human error. It was not a result of Telstra failing to have reasonable steps in place to protect the personal information of its customers, as required by the Privacy Act."

The government probe determined that Telstra had security measures in place to protect customer personal information involved in mail campaigns. These measures included privacy obligations in agreements with mailing houses, privacy impact assessments, and procedures to ensure staff handle personal information appropriately during mail campaigns.

"In this instance, taking into account the range of measures Telstra has in place for mail campaigns, I consider that the one-off human error that occurred does not mean that Telstra failed to comply with its obligation to take reasonable steps to protect the personal information of its customers. Therefore, I consider that Telstra has not breached this particular aspect of the Privacy Act", the privacy commissioner said.

The commissioner determined that Telstra had acted "immediately" to prevent further breaches, notify customers, and review its data security practices.

In the report, Pilgrim related that the Australian government is currently considering recommendations from the Australian Law Reform Commission to introduce mandatory data breach notification laws in Australia.

See also

 Telstra Business Awards
 Internet television in Australia
 Subscription television in Australia

References

236. Telstra Speed test

External links
 

Telstra
Telecommunications companies of Australia
Internet service providers of Australia
Mobile phone companies of Australia
Companies based in Melbourne
Mass media companies established in 1975
Telecommunications companies established in 1975
Australian companies established in 1975
Australian brands
Companies listed on the Australian Securities Exchange
Former Commonwealth Government-owned companies of Australia
Online content distribution
Online music stores of Australia
Video rental services
Australian streaming companies